Haremtepe is a village in the Çayeli District, Rize Province, in the Black Sea Region of Turkey. Its population is 668 (2021).

History 
According to list of villages in Laz language book (2009), name of the village is Checheva.

Geography

References

Villages in Rize Province
Populated places in Çayeli District